Kai Rautio (born July 22, 1964) is a Finnish former professional ice hockey defenceman.

Rautio played 12 seasons in the SM-liiga, registering 68 goals, 110 assists, 178 points, and 326 penalty minutes, while playing 535 games with four teams between 1985–86 and 1998–99.

Rautio began the 2013–14 Liiga season as the head coach for HPK, but was replaced on October 14, 2014, by Pasi Arvonen.

References

External links

1964 births
Living people
Finnish ice hockey coaches
Finnish ice hockey defencemen
HIFK (ice hockey) players
KalPa players
HPK players
Oulun Kärpät players
Sportspeople from Oulu